The Neroly Formation is a geologic formation in the East Bay region of the San Francisco Bay Area in California.

Areas it is found include western Contra Costa County.

It preserves fossils dating back to the Neogene period.

See also

 List of fossiliferous stratigraphic units in California
 Paleontology in California

References
 

Neogene California
Geology of Contra Costa County, California
Geologic formations of California